McLeod Lake or Lake McLeod may refer to:

Lakes 
Canada
 McLeod Lake (Alberta), a lake in Alberta once known as Carson Lake

United States
 Lake McLeod (Florida), a lake in Polk County, Florida

Other places 
Canada
 McLeod Lake, British Columbia, an unincorporated community in British Columbia